The Petoskey Grocery Company Building, also known as the George T. Zipp Lumber Company Building, is a commercial building located at 616 Petoskey Street in Petoskey, Michigan. It was added to the National Register of Historic Places in 1986.

The Zipp Lumber Company Building is a three-story brick  Queen Anne commercial structure built on a trapezoidal plan, with pedimented dormers and a hipped roof. The trapezoidal plan accommodates the irregular lot adjacent to the railroad tracks. The walls are paneled to simulate pilasters. Windows are one-over-one wood framed units.

The building was first occupied by the Petoskey Grocery Company, which was incorporated in 1900. In 1917, the George T. Zipp Lumber Company moved into the building. Zipp Lumber occupied the building for many years. After they vacated the building, it was refurbished into the Emmet County Professional Office Building.

References

National Register of Historic Places in Michigan
Queen Anne architecture in Michigan
Emmet County, Michigan
Grocery store buildings